Jack Christopher Dorney (born 9 January 1990) is an English footballer who plays as a midfielder for Northwich Victoria.

Career

Bury
Born in Ashton-under-Lyne, Greater Manchester, Dorney started his career with the Bury youth system and in 2007 and made his first team debut in a 3–1 defeat against Chesterfield on 7 September 2007. He signed a two-and-half-year professional contract with Bury in November.

Leigh Genesis (loan)
He joined Leigh Genesis on loan on 26 March 2009.

Leigh Genesis
After being released by Bury he joined Leigh permanently.

Chorley
He signed for Chorley in May 2010.
Dorney scored 20 goals during Chorley's 2010–11 promotion, his 20th goal coming as the clincher during Chorley's playoff final victory over AFC Fylde. Despite being instrumental to Chorley's promotion Dorney was let go at the end of the season.

FC Halifax Town
He then joined FC Halifax Town.

Woodley Sports / Stockport Sports
He joined Woodley Sports in July 2011.

AFC Fylde
He then joined AFC Fylde.

Chorley
Dorney rejoined Chorley in January 2014.

Trafford
In August 2015 he joined Trafford.

Chorley
In February 2016 he returned again to Chorley.

Ashton United
In summer of 2016 he moved to Ashton United.

Trafford
In January 2017 he rejoined Trafford.

Northwich Victoria
After two and a half months at Droylsden F.C., Dorney joined Northwich Victoria on 29 October 2019.

References

External links

1990 births
Living people
Footballers from Ashton-under-Lyne
English footballers
Association football midfielders
Bury F.C. players
Leigh Genesis F.C. players
Chorley F.C. players
FC Halifax Town players
Stockport Sports F.C. players
AFC Fylde players
Trafford F.C. players
Ashton United F.C. players
Droylsden F.C. players
Northwich Victoria F.C. players
English Football League players